The Aquarium is an album by The Aquarium, released in 2006 on the Dischord records label.

Track listing
"Maxxo Sesh" – 3:26
"Can't Afford To Live Here" – 3:39
"Waiting For The Girl" – 3:07
"Credits" – 3:56
"Good People" – 5:19
"Channel 9" – 1:44
"White House" – 2:13
"Golden Pyramid" – 1:19
"Through The Tunnel" – 2:22
"Slow Space" – 3:25
"Aquarium Dream" – 3:50

Personnel
Jason Hutto – Electric piano, keyboard, vocals
Laura Harris – Drums
Brendan Canty - Mixing

Album was recorded by Jason Caddell/Inner Ear Studios.
Mastering by TJ Lipple at Silver Sonya.

References

2006 debut albums
Dischord Records albums